The Liga Mexicana Elite de Hockey (LMEH) was the highest level ice hockey competition in Mexico. The league comprised four clubs, all based in Mexico City.

Overview
The Mexican League Elite de Hockey, LME, Ice Hockey was inaugurated on 2 October 2010 with the aim to establish Mexico as a high-level international competitor in ice hockey.

The participation of the best players in Mexico could serve as encouragement for those players at lower levels of the sport in Mexico and eventually play on the Mexico national team at international competitions against high quality foreign teams.

The first League season (2010–2011) started with 4 teams: Mayan Astronomers, Aztec Eagle Warriors, Teotihucan Priests and Zapotec Totems, which were integrated through a draft, where players are ranked in categories "AAA" "AA", "A" and then, each team chose their players in succession, so that 4 sets have the same competitive level.

Fifteen days before the "play off" teams have a period of transfer or exchange of players, where teams will have the opportunity to improve their competitive edge.

They play a four round system ("round robin") and their final. The team with the most points will automatically qualify for the final. Those who remain in second and third place play a best-of-three series. The winner will play the number-one team during the finals. The champion is declared when a best-of-three series is played between these two last teams.

For the second season, the Mexican Sports Federation Ice Hockey, AC seek to integrate the Mexican League Elite, a fifth team will consist of novice players. This new team will have the right to select some players from the four other teams prior to start; but the existing four teams can identify a list of "protected players" that the new expansion team cannot select. Each year will include a Mexican Elite League expansion team until there are 8 teams.

Mexican Sports Federation Ice Hockey, AC, awarded cash prizes for winning team in the near future, aims to set salaries for players of all teams, as well as explore the possibility of bringing foreign players to integrate the different Mexican League Elite teams.

For the 2022-2023 season, the league implemented a period of free agency for all eligible players with the goal of allowing the market to establish player compensation. The free agency period began on July 13, 2022, with the largest contract being awarded to F Sanjay Sarker (formerly of the Lerma Sharks). He was signed to an 8 year $48 million MXN pesos contract. Due to team cash flow constraints a portion of the salary was paid in kind with livestock and tequila.

Teams
All of the teams are based in Mexico City, and games are played at the Centro Santa Fe ice rink.

League champions

By seasons

All-time record

References

External links
 Official website

Ice hockey competitions in Mexico
Ice hockey leagues
Professional sports leagues in Mexico